is a Japanese film director and screenwriter.

Life and career
Yoshikazu Katō was born in Kyoto in 1972, and became a fan of the pink film while still in junior high school. He graduated from the Nikkatsu Visual Arts Academy in 1993, and began working in the film industry in 1995. He worked as assistant director on nearly 100 pink films beginning with Hisayasu Satō's  (1995), for the gay-themed ENK studio. Also at OP Eiga he filmed Molester's Train: Sensitive Fingers (2007) which was given the Best Film award at the Pink Grand Prix and which won Katō the award for Best Director. At the Kansai region Pinky Ribbon Awards the film was also given the top award, the Gold Prize.

Ninja films
Katō directed the V-Cinema ninja-sexploitation series  in 2006 and 2007. The films featured AV idols as Kunoichi protagonists and were later released in the United States by Switchblade Pictures.

Twin Blades of the Ninja (Risa Kouda)
Ninjaken: The Naked Sword (Kaede Matsushima)
Ninja She-Devil (Yuma Asami)
I Was a Teenage Ninja (Saki Ninomiya)

Award-winning films

"Ten Best" films, Pink Grand Prix
 2007 1st place:

Pinky Ribbon Awards
 2007 Gold Prize:

Bibliography

References

 
|-
! colspan="3" style="background: #DAA520;" | Pink Grand Prix
|-

Japanese film directors
Pink film directors
Japanese screenwriters
1972 births
Living people
People from Kyoto Prefecture